Jeyaveera Cinkaiariyan was the Aryacakravarti king of the Jaffna Kingdom in modern-day northern Sri Lanka, who had a military confrontation with a southern chief known as Alagukonar al. According to traditional sources, Alagkkonara defeated Jeyaveera's naval and land forces and assumed royal power in the southern Gampola Kingdom. Later, King Harihara II's brother Yuvaraja Virupanna invaded Sri Lanka from Karnataka, defeated Alagkkonara and established a pillar of victory there.

Until this defeat all southern kings were paying tribute to the Aryachakravartis. He or his successor is credited with having left behind an inscription in the South Indian Hindu temple Rameswaram about renovating its sanctum sanctorum. It indicated the stones for the renovations were shipped from the city of Trincomalee in present-day eastern Sri Lanka. Most of the inscriptions on the base of the sanctum were either destroyed or removed during a suit between the priests and the Raja of Ramnad in 1866.

He composed as a chronicle in verse the traditional history of the Koneswaram temple, entitled "Dakshina Kailasa Puranam", known today as the Sthala Puranam of Koneshwaram Temple.

Notes

References

1410 deaths
Kings of Jaffna
Sri Lankan Hindus
Sri Lankan Tamil royalty
Year of birth unknown